General elections were held in Antigua and Barbuda on 29 November 1965, and continued on 15 December after three candidates withdrew before the original date. They were won by the governing Antigua Labour Party (ALP), whose leader Vere Bird was re-elected as Chief Minister.

Six ALP candidates ran unopposed, meaning the party had won the elections before a vote was cast. Voter turnout was 42.8%.

Results

References

Elections in Antigua and Barbuda
Antigua
1965 in Antigua and Barbuda
Election and referendum articles with incomplete results
Landslide victories
November 1965 events in North America